Emil Friedrich Franz Maximilian Graf von Schlitz genannt von Görtz (15 February 1851, in Berlin - 9 October 1914, in Frankfurt) was a German sculptor, Hessian nobleman, cultural policymaker and confidant of Kaiser Wilhelm II.

Life 
He was the son of the Grand Ducal diplomat Count Karl von Schlitz genannt von Görtz and his wife, Princess Anna of Sayn-Wittgenstein-Berleburg (1827–1902). His studies began at the Academy of Fine Arts, Munich, under the sculptor Joseph Echteler. He assumed the title of "Graf" (Count) upon his father's death. From 1885 to 1901, he was Director of the Weimar Saxon-Grand Ducal Art School. In 1894, he founded a pension and annuity association for German artists.

Prince (later Kaiser) Wilhelm and he had been brought up together, and were both tutored by the famous conservative pedagogue, Georg Ernst Hinzpeter, so they became lifelong friends. He was part of what was known as the "Liebenberger Kreis" (circle, or round table), Wilhelm's inner group of advisors and confidants. The Kaiser was a frequent visitor to the Görtz estates. From 1891 to 1910, he went there every summer to go grouse hunting.

Work

His best-known sculptures were those in Group 11 of the Siegesallee (Victory Avenue), consisting of Louis II, Elector of Brandenburg as the centerpiece with Hasso der Rote von Wedel and Friedrich von Lochen, the Landeshauptmann of Altmark in 1346, as the side figures. These statues (along with most of the others in the Siegesallee) were heavily damaged in World War II and are currently displayed in the Spandau Citadel.

His statue of Gaspard II de Coligny, in front of the Berliner Schloss, disappeared entirely.

Personal life
On 15 February 1876 in Konstanz, he married Sophia Cavalcanti d'Albuquerque de Villeneuve (1858-1902), daughter of Julio Constancio de Villeneuve, Comes Romanus (1839-1910) and his wife, Anna Maria Cavalcanti de Albuquerque (1837-1890). They had:
 Countess Anna von Schlitz genannt von Görtz (1877-1938); married Valentin Emanuel MacSwiney (1871-1945)
 Hereditary Count Carl von Schlitz genannt von Görtz (1877-1911); married Princess Amelie of Thurn und Taxis (1876-1930); had issue
 Countess Elisabeth von Schlitz genannt von Görtz (1879-1940)
 Count Wilhelm von Schlitz genannt von Görtz (1882-1935); married Baroness Catharina Riedesel zu Eisenbach (1883-1969); had issue
 Countess Marie Anna von Schlitz genannt von Görtz (1883-1946); married Count Heinrich von Luxburg (1874-1960); had issue
 Countess Margareta von Schlitz genannt von Görtz (1885-1959); married Magnus von Levetzow (1871-1939); had issue

Honours
He received the following orders and decorations:

References

Other sources/Further reading 
 Entry in the Deutsche Biographische Enzyklopädie
 Isabel Hull, The Entourage of Kaiser Wilhelm II, Cambridge (1982) 
 John Röhl, The Kaiser and his Court : Wilhelm II and the Government of Germany, translated by Terence F. Cole. Cambridge (1994)  
 Jochen Lengemann: MdL Hessen 1808–1996, Biographical Index, N.G.Elwert (1996), page 333.

External links 

1851 births
1914 deaths
Artists from Berlin
20th-century German sculptors
20th-century German male artists
19th-century German sculptors
German male sculptors
Academic staff of Bauhaus University, Weimar
Recipients of the Military Merit Order (Bavaria)
Recipients of the Order of the White Eagle (Russia)
Commanders Grand Cross of the Order of the Polar Star